Austendike is a village in the civil parish of Moulton in Lincolnshire, England. The population is included in the civil parish of Weston

Villages in Lincolnshire
South Holland, Lincolnshire